The 2011–12 MiWay T20 Challenge was the ninth season of the MiWay T20 Challenge, established by the Cricket South Africa. The tournament was previously known as the Standard Bank Pro20 Series. The tournament was played between 15 February and 1 April 2012. The tournament had an expanded tournament format. It featured the addition of a seventh team, a change in the group stage from a single to a double round-robin tournament, and a 2-match knockout stage.

Venues

Rules and regulations
The tournament is divided into a group stage and a knockout stage. In the group stage, teams face each other in a double round-robin tournament (i.e. each team plays every other team twice, once at home and once away). At the end of the group stage, the top team qualifies for the final. The teams in second and third take part in a play-off match with the winners contesting the final. If a match in the knockout stage ends with a tie, a Super Over will determine the winner.

Points were awarded as follows in the group stage:

 The team that achieves a run rate of 1.25 times that of the opposition shall be rewarded one bonus point.
 A team's run rate will be calculated by reference to the runs scored in an innings divided by the number of overs faced.
 Points are deducted for slow over rate at 1 point per over not completed within the allotted 90 minutes.

In the event of teams finishing on equal points, the right to play in the semi-finals will be determined in the following order of priority:

 The team with the most wins;
 If still equal, the team with the most wins over the other team(s) who are equal on points and have the same number of wins;
 If still equal, the team with the highest number of bonus points;
 If still equal, the team with the highest net run rate;
 The team with the higher runs to wickets ratio throughout the series.

Teams and standings

(C) = Eventual champion; (R) = Runner-up.
Note: The winner and runner-up qualify for the 2012 Champions League Twenty20.

Results

Group stage

Fixtures
All times shown are in South African Standard Time (UTC+02).

Group stage

Knockout stage

References

External links
 Tournament site on ESPN Cricinfo

South African domestic cricket competitions
MiWay T20 Challenge
2011–12 South African cricket season